Loxophlebia splendens is a moth of the subfamily Arctiinae. It was described by Heinrich Benno Möschler in 1872. It is found in French Guiana.

References

Loxophlebia
Moths described in 1872